"Here Comes The Big Rush" is the second and final single from Echobelly's third album Lustra. It was released by the Britpop group in October 1997.

The song was included on the greatest hits album I Can't Imagine The World Without Me.

A music video was made for the song.

It reached number 56 in the UK Singles Chart.

Track listing

UK CD 1

UK CD 2

UK CD 3

UK promo CD

12" promo vinyl

Tracks 1 & 2 appear on the a-side, tracks 3 & 4 appear on the b-side.

Personnel
Bass – James Harris
Drums – Andy Henderson 
Guitar – Glenn Johansson
Voice – Sonya Madan
Engineer – Niven Garland, Roy Spong
Producer - Gil Norton, Echobelly

References

1997 singles
Echobelly songs
1997 songs
Epic Records singles